The Long Run is a 2000 film starring Oscar nominee Armin Mueller-Stahl as a running coach and Nthati Moshesh as a young runner.  It was directed by Jean Stewart and written by Johann Potgieter.

The film is based around the Comrades Marathon, an ultra-marathon race run over a distance of approximately 90 km (55.9 mi) between the capital of the Kwazulu-Natal Province of South Africa, Pietermaritzburg, and the coastal city of Durban.

Cast 

 Armin Mueller-Stahl as Bertold 'Barry' Bohmer 
 Nthati Moshesh as Christine Moyo
 Paterson Joseph as Gasa
 Desmond Dube as Miso

External links

2000 films
2000 drama films
Films set in South Africa
English-language South African films
Films scored by Trevor Jones
South African drama films